Schuchk, also known as Santa Rosa, Santa Rosa Ranch, and Schuchk Ka Wuacho Awotam, is a populated place situated in Pima County, Arizona, United States. The name is derived from the Tohono O'odham , which means 'black ones', referring to black hills.

References

Populated places in Pima County, Arizona